The Daye Group is a geological formation in China. It dates back to the Hettangian-Pliensbachian and it preserves dinosaur fossils, although none can be referred to the genus level.

Vertebrate fauna

See also
 List of dinosaur-bearing rock formations

References

Geologic groups of Asia
Jurassic System of Asia
Geologic formations of China